Welwitschia Mirabilis International Airport  is an airport serving the Atlantic port city of Moçâmedes, the capital of Namibe Province in Angola.

Airlines and destinations

See also
 List of airports in Angola
 Transport in Angola
 Yuri Gagarin

References

External links
OurAirports - Namibe
 
 

Welwitschia Mirabilis
Namibe Province